Camp Michaux was a secret World War II camp for interrogating prisoners of war.  The camp northwest of the Pine Grove Iron Works was previously used as a CCC camp that provided labor for state-owned lands (e.g., Pine Grove Furnace State Park) and was used as a summer camp.  The POW camp commander was Captain Lawrence C. Thomas, who also commanded the World War II Prisoner of War Camp, Gettysburg Battlefield, Pennsylvania.

|Photo of Pennsylvania State historical marker

|Photo of the sign on the grounds of Camp Michaux.  It contains good historical information.

|Photo of the farm house ruins adjacent to Camp Michaux

References

Military facilities in Pennsylvania
Closed installations of the United States Army
Civilian Conservation Corps camps
Civilian Conservation Corps in Pennsylvania
History of Cumberland County, Pennsylvania
South Mountain Range (Maryland−Pennsylvania)
World War II prisoner of war camps in the United States